G. Govindarajulu Naidu was an acclaimed music director in 1940s and 50s in the south Indian film industry. Hailing from Tiruchirappalli, he was one among the musicians who defined the way of music in South Indian film industry. He composed music for Tamil and Telugu movies.

Early life
Govindarajulu Naidu came from a Telugu speaking family from Thiruchi. This is where M. K. Thyagaraja Bhagavathar (MKT) used to sing in their house and Naidu introduced MKT to his children. G. Govindarajulu is a harmonium player in special dramas, but was also known as the one who taught music for K. B. Sundarambal. He also sold musical instruments and gramophone in Thiruchi, but the business was not doing very well. In 1940, Naidu took his family to Madras to look for greener pasture there.

T. G. Lingappa was the second son of Naidu and had learned to play several musical instruments from him. His grandchildren live in Chennai & Bangalore.

Career
Few may be the films that came his way in a career spanning 3 decades, G. Govindarajulu Naidu but has left a lingering impact in his creations especially movies like Andhaman Kaidhi, Manidhanum Mirugamum, Maya Manithan, Baghdad Thirudan and Raja Bakthi.

He worked with singers like Thiruchi Loganathan, M. L. Vasanthakumari, C. S. Jayaraman, R. Balasaraswathi Devi, P. Leela, Jikki, T. V. Rathnam, A. P. Komala,  N. L. Ganasaraswathi, A. M. Rajah, Ghantasala, T. M. Soundararajan, Seerkazhi Govindarajan, Radha Jayalakshmi, K. Jamuna Rani, P. Susheela.

The singing actors N. C. Vasanthakokilam, V. V. Sadagopan, K. Sarangapani, N. S. Krishnan, T. A. Madhuram, J. P. Chandrababu and P. Bhanumathi also sang memorable songs under his compositions.

Works
Some compositions of G. Govindarajulu Naidu:

kaaNi nilam vENdum from Andhaman Kaidhi by C. S. Jayaraman & M. L. Vasanthakumari
vaazhvin jeevan kaadhalE from Andhaman Kaidhi by Ghantasala / P. Leela
anju rooba nOttai from Andhaman Kaidhi by T. V. Rathnam
paarmuzhuthum irul parappum from Raja Bakthi by R. Balasaraswathi Devi
inba kuyil kuralinimai from Manidhanum Mirugamum by  A. M. Rajah & M. L. Vasanthakumari
imayamalai chaaralilE from Manidhanum Mirugamum by M. L. Vasanthakumari
kaalamenum siRpi seiyyum from Manidhanum Mirugamum by C. S. Jayaraman
 manadhil urudhi vENdum from Kalvanin Kadhali by T. M. Soundararajan & P. Bhanumathi
kanna kanna vaaraai from Maya Manidhan by Jikki
sokkudhE manam suththudhE jagam from Baghdad Thirudan by P. Suseela
 "ennai konjam paaru" from Raja Bakthi by P. Suseela

Filmography
Music direction in Tamil Movies.

References

Tamil film score composers
Tamil musicians
Possibly living people
Year of birth missing
Indian male film score composers
Musicians from Tiruchirappalli